5 Card Stud is a 2002 American romance film directed by Hank Saroyan and starring Khrystyne Haje, Lawrence H. Toffler, Brian Everett, Doris Hess, Steven Houska, Kevin McClatchy, Jeffrey Vincent Parise, and Brian Everett.

Premise
A bartender with a fear of commitment has limited his social life to a weekly poker game with the guys. His best friend sets him up with sure thing one night stand and the two fall in love.

External links
http://www.dvdtalk.com/reviews/17897/5-card-stud/
http://www.dvdverdict.com/reviews/5cardstud.php

The New York Times Movies

2000s romance films
2002 films
American romance films
2000s English-language films
2000s American films
English-language romance films